Hamilton Harlow (1890-1964) was an American architect known for his apartment buildings in Cambridge, Massachusetts. Harlow's pioneering work in bringing large apartment   buildings to Cambridge made a significant mark on the cityscape surrounding Harvard Square and Harvard University. Today, Harlow's apartments are known for their charming layouts: real estate listings regularly note when an apartment is in a "Harlow Building." Harlow's father, Frank S. Harlow, was a builder, and many of Harlow's architectural plans were for properties owned by his father. Harlow' and his spouse, Georgeana, had a son, Robert Moore Harlow (1917-1994). Hamilton and Robert founded Harlow Properties, Inc., a real estate management firm that for 40 years managed apartments and performed condominium conversions across Cambridge; the firm's "kindness to tenants who came on hard financial times" and development of programs to help  "elderly tenants and first-time tenant homeowners...to purchase their units" led the city of Cambridge to honor Robert Harlow with an honorary square in 2003.

Career 
In 1916, Harlow was working from 101 Tremont Street, Boston.  In 1919, Harlow joined Albert H. Dow and Kenneth C. Kimball in founding Dow, Harlow, and Kimball, Architects and Engineers, in Boston, Massachusetts. An announcement of the new partnership in the journal Architecture called Harlow "a well known young Boston Architect." Kimball's speciality was engineering, while Dow was a well-established figure. In 1921, Harlow left Dow, Harlow, and Kimball to start his own firm, opening an office at 1388 Massachusetts Avenue. Harlow's offices in 1927 were at 4 Brattle Street.

Apartment Buildings in Cambridge, MA 
 Spencer Court, 9 Dana Street, constructed 1927
 44 Langdon Street, brick, 12 units, constructed 1915
 7 Linnaean Street
 Building on the corner of Linnaean and Avon Hill
 46 Shepard Street
 77 and 79 Martin Street, brick, 32 apartments 
 11 Story Street, stucco, 25 condominiums
 61 Garfield Street, 17 units
 52 Garden Street, brick, 42 units, elevator building, 1924
 Bowdoin Court, 39 and 41 Bowdoin Street, Brick, 33 units, 1927
 Proposed: 356 Harvard St and Ellery St., 1929. "Superstructure plans drawn—will be figured in the spring for the apartment building of 24 suites to be erected at 253 Harvard and Ellery streets, for J. A. Carrig, 1374 Massachusetts avenue. Plans by Architects Hamilton, Harlow, 4 Brattle street." The building at this location is called "The President."

Other Known Buildings 
Seven residences on Brooks Street, Medford, MA, 1916

References 

1890 births
1964 deaths
Architects from Massachusetts
Architects from Maine
Architects from Boston
Architects from Cambridge, Massachusetts